Mesitol (2,4,6-trimethylphenol) is an organic compound with the formula (CH3)3C6H2OH. It is one of several isomers of trimethylphenol. The name and structure of mesitol derives from the combination of mesitylene and phenol.

Synthesis
Mesitol is the main product from the methylation of phenol with methanol in the presence of a solid acid. 

It can also be obtained by reaction of mesitylene with peroxymonophosphoric acid:

An alternative route involves palladium-catalyzed reaction of bromomesitylene with potassium hydroxide.

References

Alkylphenols